Lynn Elizabeth Kreviazuk (born May 2, 1991) is a Canadian curler from Ottawa, Ontario.

Career
Kreviazuk was the longtime lead for the Rachel Homan rink. She first joined the team in 2005 as its second. In 2006, the team won the Ontario Bantam Championship, followed by a gold medal at the Canada Winter Games the following season.

In 2008, she became only the second female to skip a team to the Ontario Bantam Mixed Championship.

Both in 2009 and 2010 as a member of the Homan rink, she won the provincial junior championships. She won again in 2011 as a member of the Clancy Grandy rink. In 2010, she won the Canadian Junior Curling Championships and a silver medal at the 2010 World Junior Curling Championships.

She coached the Nunavut women's team at the 2013 and 2014 Canadian Junior Curling Championships.

Personal life
Kreviazuk works as an executive assistant at the House of Commons of Canada. She is currently in a relationship with fellow curler David Mathers.

Her sisters are Alison Kreviazuk, who played second for the Homan rink, and Cheryl Kreviazuk, who played as alternate for the Homan rink in 2014-2015 and 2016-2017. Her second cousin is the singer Chantal Kreviazuk.

Teams

References

External links

 Lynn Kreviazuk | Athlete Information | 2015 Winter Universiade | FISU

Canadian people of Ukrainian descent
1991 births
Curlers from Ottawa
Living people
Canadian women curlers
Universiade medalists in curling
Universiade silver medalists for Canada
Competitors at the 2015 Winter Universiade